Guillaume Gomez (born 25 July 1969 in Orléans) is a French former racing driver.

References

1969 births
Living people
French racing drivers
International Formula 3000 drivers
Sportspeople from Orléans
20th-century French people

Team Astromega drivers
DAMS drivers